Lippo Hertzka (19 November 1904 – 14 March 1951) was a Hungarian football player and manager of Jewish descent. He played for Essener Turnerbund, MTK Budapest and Real Sociedad. After retiring, he coached seven teams, including Real Sociedad and Real Madrid, a team which he coached for 2 years (1930–1932) and led to an undefeated La Liga championship during the 1931–32 season, which meant the first La Liga title for the white squad. He also won two league titles in Portugal for Benfica.

He coached Real Sociedad, Athletic Bilbao, Sevilla, Real Madrid, Hércules, Granada, Benfica, Belenenses, Porto, Estoril, Académica, Vila Real, Portimonense and União Montemor.

References

External links 

1904 births
1951 deaths
Hungarian Jews
Jewish footballers
Footballers from Budapest
Hungarian footballers
Association football forwards
Hungarian football managers
Hungarian expatriate football managers
Hungarian expatriate sportspeople in Spain
Real Sociedad footballers
Real Sociedad managers
Athletic Bilbao managers
Sevilla FC managers
Real Madrid CF managers
Hércules CF managers
S.L. Benfica managers
FC Porto managers
Granada CF managers
G.D. Estoril Praia managers
La Liga managers
Expatriate football managers in Portugal
Expatriate football managers in Spain
União Montemor managers